Ogwa-cha or five fruit tea is a traditional Korean tea made with walnut, ginkgo, jujube, chestnut, and gotgam (dried persimmon). The ingredients are mashed with ginger, boiled in water, and strained to make the tea. Optionally, honey can be added to taste.

See also 
 Daechu-cha
 Sujeonggwa

References 

Herbal tea
Korean tea
Traditional Korean medicine